Nathan T. Smith (born August 16, 1978) is an American amateur golfer.

Smith won the U.S. Mid-Amateur four times (2003, 2009, 2010, 2012), the Sunnehanna Amateur (2011), the Pennsylvania Amateur twice (2002, 2009), the West Penn Amateur four times (2007–10), and the R. Jay Sigel Match Play three times (2011, 2013, 2015). He also won the inaugural U.S. Amateur Four-Ball, with Todd White, in 2015.

Smith played in three consecutive Walker Cups (2009, 2011, 2013).

Smith has played in five major championships (four Masters and one U.S. Open) but missed the cut in each of them. He came within one shot of making the cut at the 2004 Masters Tournament, but had a double-bogey on the 36th and final hole.

Amateur wins (16)
2002 Pennsylvania Amateur
2003 U.S. Mid-Amateur
2007 West Penn Amateur
2008 West Penn Amateur
2009 West Penn Amateur, U.S. Mid-Amateur, Pennsylvania Amateur
2010 West Penn Amateur, U.S. Mid-Amateur
2011 R. Jay Sigel Match Play, Sunnehanna Amateur
2012 U.S. Mid-Amateur
2013 R. Jay Sigel Match Play
2015 U.S. Amateur Four-Ball (with Todd White), R. Jay Sigel Match Play
2017 R. Jay Sigel Match Play

Source:

Results in major championships

Note: Smith only played in the Masters Tournament and the U.S. Open.

CUT = missed the half-way cut

U.S. national team appearances
Amateur
Walker Cup: 2009 (winners), 2011, 2013 (winners)

References

American male golfers
Amateur golfers
Allegheny College alumni
People from Brookville, Pennsylvania
1978 births
Living people